Union Square Cafe is an American restaurant featuring New American cuisine with Italian influences, located at 101 E 19th St (between Park Avenue South and Irving Place), in the Union Square neighborhood of the Manhattan borough of New York City, New York.  It is owned by the Union Square Hospitality Group.

History
In October 1985, Danny Meyer opened Union Square Cafe with chef Ali Barker. In December 2015, The restaurant's lease at 21 E 16th Street ended. In December 2016, Union Square Cafe reopened at Hotel on Rivington, 101 East 19th Street.

Design
The original restaurant was designed by architect Larry Bogdanow. The new location is designed by architect David Rockwell.

Awards and accolades
The restaurant has won multiple awards and honors since its inception, including the ranking of "Favorite New York Restaurant" in the Zagat Survey in the 1997, 1998, 1999, 2000, 2001, 2002, 2004 and 2008 editions. Notably, the restaurant did not receive a Michelin star during Michelin's 2005 review of New York restaurants, leading to concerns that the guide might be biased towards French cuisine or restaurants that "emphasize formality and presentation".
 1992, Outstanding Service, James Beard Foundation
 1997, Outstanding Restaurant, James Beard Foundation
 1997–2001, Zagat Survey #1 Favorite New York Restaurant
 1998–1999, New York Times Three Star Award
 1999, Outstanding Wine Service, James Beard Foundation
 2000, Michael Romano inducted into "Who's Who of Food & Beverage", James Beard Foundation
 2000–2002, Forbes magazine Three Star Review
 2001, James Beard Foundation Best Chef New York City – Michael Romano
 2003, Zagat Survey #2 Favorite New York Restaurant
 2004, Wine Spectator Award of Excellence
 2004, Zagat Survey #1 Favorite New York Restaurant
 2005, Forbes magazine Three Star Review
 2005–2007, Zagat Survey #2 Favorite New York Restaurant
 2006-2010, Wine Spectator Best of Award of Excellence
 2008, Zagat Survey #1 Favorite New York Restaurant
 2012-2013, Wine Spectator Best of Award of Excellence

In popular culture
The 2016 novel Sweetbitter features a  protagonist who works as a waitress in  a fictionalized version of the restaurant; Vanity Fair referred to the novel as a "love letter" to Union Square Cafe.

See also

 Cuisine of New York City
 List of New American restaurants

References

External links 
 

1985 establishments in New York City
Union Square, Manhattan
New American restaurants in the United States
Restaurants in Manhattan
Restaurants established in 1985
James Beard Foundation Award winners